Saint Joseph of Cupertino Parish is a territorial parish serving Latin Rite Catholics in Cupertino, California, United States. The parish is named for Joseph of Cupertino, and had its origin in a small wooden chapel at the Villa Maria retreat located in Stevens Creek Canyon (Stevens Creek was known in Spanish as Arroyo San José de Cupertino). Villa Maria was the country home of the Jesuit fathers of Santa Clara University, who purchased the 320 acre (1.3 km²) tract in 1873. Shortly thereafter, Brother Tom Cunningham cleared the land for orchards and vineyards and built a simple frame chapel of redwood, 18 by 25 feet (5x8 m), in the mission style, with buttresses and towers.

The parish moved to a location near the center of Cupertino, on De Anza Boulevard. The parish is now a part of the Diocese of San Jose in California. The pastor is Father Michael Syjueco.

References

External links

Saint Joseph of Cupertino Parish

Roman Catholic Diocese of San Jose in California
Roman Catholic churches in California
Churches in Santa Clara County, California